Håkan Karl Leonard Westergren (29 April 1899 – 15 October 1981) was a Swedish actor. He was mostly known for playing in Swedish comedy movies during the 1930s and 1940s, but was sometimes seen in some more serious roles. He was married to Swedish actress Inga Tidblad and a daughter is the actress Meg Westergren.

Selected filmography
 Say It with Music (1929)
 For Her Sake (1930)
 Frida's Songs (1930)
 The Red Day (1931)
 The False Millionaire (1931)
 Colourful Pages (1931)
 Tired Theodore (1931)
 International Match (1932)
 His Life's Match (1932)
 House Slaves (1933)
 What Do Men Know? (1933)
 Swedenhielms (1935)
 He, She and the Money (1936)
 It Pays to Advertise (1936)
 Kungen kommer (1936)
 The Wedding Trip (1936)
 Unfriendly Relations (1936)
 Adventure (1936)
 Sara Learns Manners (1937)
 Dollar (1938)
 The Great Love (1938)
 Nothing But the Truth (1939)
 With Open Arms (1940)
 Her Melody (1940)
 A Crime (1940)
 One, But a Lion! (1940)
 Tonight or Never (1941)
 How to Tame a Real Man (1941)
 Mister Collins' Adventure (1943)
 His Excellency (1944)
 The Green Lift (1944)
 The Invisible Wall (1944)
 My People Are Not Yours (1944)
 Johansson and Vestman (1946)
 The Kiss on the Cruise (1950)
 Beef and the Banana (1951)
 Divorced (1951)
 Blondie, Beef and the Banana (1952)
 Getting Married (1955)
 Uncle's (1955)
 Pistol (1973)

External links

1899 births
1981 deaths
People from Solna Municipality
Swedish male film actors
Swedish male silent film actors
20th-century Swedish male actors